Municipal election in Brno was held as part of Czech municipal elections in 1990. Movement for Autonomous Democracy–Party for Moravia and Silesia received highest number of votes but remained in opposition. Civic Forum formed the new council and leader of Association for Brno Václav Mencl became new Mayor.

Result

References

1990
1990s elections in Czechoslovakia